The Honda CM450A  is a motorcycle made by Honda in 1982 and 1983. It was based on the CB400 and CM400 models (1978–1981), especially the CM400A Hondamatic (1980–1981). It had a  SOHC parallel twin engine with two carburetors and a two-speed transmission with a torque converter. It was not a full automatic, however, because the rider had to manually shift between low and high. It is called automatic because there is no clutch required due to the torque converter, and shared the Hondamatic trade name with Honda cars that had true automatic transmissions. Both models had a front disc brake and a rear drum brake. The suspension consisted of two shock absorbers at the rear and telescoping shock-absorbing front forks. The fuel tank had a  capacity. The exhaust was routed through a separate pipe and baffle on each side of the motorcycle, although both exhaust pipes shared a plenum under the motor. It had an electric start with a kick start as well.

References

CM450A
Standard motorcycles
Motorcycles powered by straight-twin engines
Motorcycles introduced in 1982